The Scramble for Africa, also called the Partition of Africa, the Conquest of Africa or the Rape of Africa, was the invasion, annexation, division, and colonization of most of Africa by seven Western European powers during an era known as New Imperialism (between 1833 and 1914). The 10 percent of Africa that was under formal European control in 1870 increased to almost 90 percent by 1914, with only Liberia and Ethiopia remaining independent.

The Berlin Conference of 1884, which regulated European colonization and trade in Africa, is usually accepted as the beginning. In the last quarter of the 19th century, there were considerable political rivalries between the European empires, which provided the impetus for the Scramble. The later years of the 19th century saw a transition from "informal imperialism" – military influence and economic dominance – to direct rule. 

Most of Africa was decolonised during the Cold War. The imperial boundaries and economic systems imposed by the Scramble still affect the politics and economy of Africa today.

Background 

By 1841, businessmen from Europe had established small trading posts along the coasts of Africa, but they seldom moved inland, preferring to stay near the sea. They primarily traded with locals. Large parts of the continent were essentially uninhabitable for Europeans because of their high mortality rates from tropical diseases such as malaria. In the middle of the 19th century, European explorers mapped much of East Africa and Central Africa.

As late as the 1870s, Europeans controlled approximately 10% of the African continent, with all their territories located near the coasts. The most important holdings were Angola and Mozambique, held by Portugal; the Cape Colony, held by Great Britain; and Algeria, held by France. By 1914, only Ethiopia and Liberia remained independent of European control, with the latter having strong connections to the United States.

Technological advances facilitated European expansion overseas. Industrialization brought about rapid advancements in transportation and communication, especially in the forms of steamships, railways and telegraphs. Medical advances also played an important role, especially medicines for tropical diseases, which helped control their adverse effects. The development of quinine, an effective treatment for malaria, made vast expanses of the tropics more accessible for Europeans.

Causes

Africa and global markets 

Sub-Saharan Africa, one of the last regions of the world largely untouched by "informal imperialism", was attractive to business entrepreneurs. During a time when Britain's balance of trade showed a growing deficit, with shrinking and increasingly protectionist continental markets during the Long Depression (1873–1896), Africa offered Britain, Germany, France, and other countries an open market that would garner them a trade surplus: a market that bought more from the colonial power than it sold overall.

Surplus capital was often more profitably invested overseas, where cheap materials, limited competition, and abundant raw materials made a greater premium possible. Another inducement for imperialism arose from the demand for raw materials, especially ivory, rubber, palm oil, cocoa, diamonds, tea, and tin. Additionally, Britain wanted control of areas of southern and eastern coasts of Africa for stopover ports on the route to Asia and its empire in India. But, excluding the area which became the Union of South Africa in 1910, European nations invested relatively limited amounts of capital in Africa compared to that in other continents. Consequently, the companies involved in tropical African commerce were relatively small, apart from Cecil Rhodes's De Beers Mining Company. Rhodes had carved out Rhodesia for himself. Leopold II of Belgium created the Congo Free State for rubber and other resource production.

Pro-imperialist colonial lobbyists such as the Alldeutscher Verband, Francesco Crispi and Jules Ferry, argued that sheltered overseas markets in Africa would solve the problems of low prices and overproduction caused by shrinking continental markets. John A. Hobson argued in Imperialism that this shrinking of continental markets was a key factor of the global "New Imperialism" period. William Easterly, however, disagrees with the link made between capitalism and imperialism, arguing that colonialism is used mostly to promote state-led development rather than corporate development. He has said that "imperialism is not so clearly linked to capitalism and the free markets... historically there has been a closer link between colonialism/imperialism and state-led approaches to development."

Strategic rivalry 

While tropical Africa was not a large zone of investment, other overseas regions were. The vast interior between Egypt and the gold and diamond-rich Southern Africa had strategic value in securing the flow of overseas trade. Britain was under political pressure to build up lucrative markets in India, Malaya, Australia and New Zealand. Thus, it wanted to secure the key waterway between East and West – the Suez Canal, completed in 1869. However, a theory that Britain sought to annex East Africa during the 1880 onwards, out of geo-strategic concerns connected to Egypt (especially the Suez Canal), has been challenged by historians such as John Darwin (1997) and Jonas F. Gjersø (2015).

The scramble for African territory also reflected concern for the acquisition of military and naval bases, for strategic purposes and the exercise of power. The growing navies, and new ships driven by steam power, required coaling stations and ports for maintenance. Defence bases were also needed for the protection of sea routes and communication lines, particularly of expensive and vital international waterways such as the Suez Canal.

Colonies were seen as assets in balance of power negotiations, useful as items of exchange at times of international bargaining. Colonies with large native populations were also a source of military power; Britain and France used large numbers of British Indian and North African soldiers, respectively, in many of their colonial wars (and would do so again in the coming World Wars). In the age of nationalism there was pressure for a nation to acquire an empire as a status symbol; the idea of "greatness" became linked with the "White Man's Burden", or sense of duty, underlying many nations' strategies.

In the early 1880s, Pierre Savorgnan de Brazza was exploring the Kingdom of Kongo for France, at the same time Henry Morton Stanley explored it on behalf of Leopold II of Belgium, who would have it as his personal Congo Free State. France occupied Tunisia in May 1881, which may have convinced Italy to join the German-Austrian Dual Alliance in 1882, thus forming the Triple Alliance. The same year, Britain occupied Egypt (hitherto an autonomous state owing nominal fealty to the Ottoman Empire), which ruled over Sudan and parts of Chad, Eritrea, and Somalia. In 1884, Germany declared Togoland, the Cameroons and South West Africa to be under its protection; and France occupied Guinea. French West Africa was founded in 1895 and French Equatorial Africa in 1910. In French Somaliland, a short-lived Russian colony in the Egyptian fort of Sagallo was briefly proclaimed by Terek Cossacks in 1889.

Germany's Weltpolitik 

Germany, divided into small states, was not initially a colonial power. In 1862, Otto von Bismarck became Minister-President of the Kingdom of Prussia, and through a series of wars with both Austria in 1866 and France in 1870 was able to unify all of Germany under Prussian rule. The German Empire was formally proclaimed on 18 January, 1871. At first, Bismarck disliked colonies but gave in to popular and elite pressure in the 1880s. He sponsored the 1884–85 Berlin Conference, which set the rules of effective control of African territories, and reduced the risk of conflict between colonial powers. Bismarck used private companies to set up small colonial operations in Africa and the Pacific.

Pan-Germanism became linked to the young nation's new imperialist drives. In the beginning of the 1880s, the Deutscher Kolonialverein was created, and published the Kolonialzeitung. This colonial lobby was also relayed by the nationalist Alldeutscher Verband. Weltpolitik (world policy) was the foreign policy adopted by Kaiser Wilhelm II in 1890, with the aim of transforming Germany into a global power through aggressive diplomacy, and the development of a large navy. Germany became the third-largest colonial power in Africa, the location of most of its 2.6 million square kilometres of colonial territory and 14 million colonial subjects in 1914. The African possessions were Southwest Africa, Togoland, the Cameroons, and Tanganyika.  Germany tried to isolate France in 1905 with the First Moroccan Crisis. This led to the 1905 Algeciras Conference, in which France's influence on Morocco was compensated by the exchange of other territories, and then to the Agadir Crisis in 1911.

Italy's expansion 

After fighting alongside France during the Crimean War (1853-56), the Kingdom of Sardinia sought to unify the Italian peninsula, with French support. Following a war with Austria in 1859, Sardinia, under the leadership of Giuseppe Garibaldi, was able to unify most of the peninsula by 1861, establishing the Kingdom of Italy. Following unification, Italy sought to expand its territory and become a great power, taking possession of parts of Eritrea in 1870 and 1882. In 1889–90, it occupied territory on the south side of the horn of Africa, forming what would become Italian Somaliland. In the disorder that followed the 1889 death of Emperor Yohannes IV, General Oreste Baratieri occupied the Ethiopian Highlands along the Eritrean coast, and Italy proclaimed the establishment of a new colony of Eritrea, with its capital moved from Massawa to Asmara. When relations between Italy and Ethiopia deteriorated, the First Italo-Ethiopian War broke out in 1895; Italian troops were defeated as the Ethiopians had numerical superiority, better organization, and support from Russia and France. In 1911, Italy engaged in a war with the Ottoman Empire, in which it acquired Tripolitania and Cyrenaica, that together formed what became known as Italian Libya. In 1919 Enrico Corradini developed the concept of Proletarian Nationalism, which was supposed to legitimise Italy's imperialism by a mixture of socialism with nationalism:

The Second Italo-Abyssinian War (1935–36), ordered by the fascist dictator Benito Mussolini, was the last colonial war (that is, intended to colonise a country, as opposed to wars of national liberation), occupying Ethiopia—which had remained the last independent African territory, apart from Liberia. Italian Ethiopia was occupied by fascist Italian forces in World War II as part of Italian East Africa though much of the mountainous countryside had remained out of Italian control due to resistance from the Arbegnoch. The occupation is an example of the expansionist policy that characterized the Axis powers as opposed to the Scramble for Africa.

History and characteristics

Colonization prior to World War I

Congo 

David Livingstone's explorations, carried on by Henry Morton Stanley, excited imaginations with Stanley's grandiose ideas for colonisation; but these found little support owing to the problems and scale of action required, except from Leopold II of Belgium, who in 1876 had organised the International African Association. From 1869 to 1874, Stanley was secretly sent by Leopold II to the Congo region, where he made treaties with several African chiefs along the Congo River and by 1882 had sufficient territory to form the basis of the Congo Free State.

While Stanley was exploring the Congo on behalf of Leopold II of Belgium, the Franco-Italian marine officer Pierre de Brazza travelled into the western Congo Basin and raised the French flag over the newly founded Brazzaville in 1881, thus occupying today's Republic of the Congo. Portugal, which also claimed the area because of old treaties with the Kingdom of Kongo, made a treaty with Britain on 26 February 1884 to block off Leopold's access to the Atlantic.

By 1890 the Congo Free State had consolidated control of its territory between Leopoldville and Stanleyville and was looking to push south down the Lualaba River from Stanleyville. At the same time, the British South Africa Company of Cecil Rhodes was expanding north from the Limpopo River, sending the Pioneer Column (guided by Frederick Selous) through Matabeleland, and starting a colony in Mashonaland.

Tippu Tip, a Zanzibari Arab based in the Sultanate of Zanzibar, also played a major role as a "protector of European explorers", ivory trader and slave trader. Having established a trading empire within Zanzibar and neighboring areas in East Africa, Tippu Tip would shift his alignment towards the rising colonial powers in the region and at the proposal of Henry Morton Stanley, Tippu Tip became a governor of the "Stanley Falls District" (Boyoma Falls) in Leopold's Congo Free State, before being involved in the Congo–Arab War against Leopold II's colonial state.

To the west, in the land where their expansions would meet, was Katanga, site of the Yeke Kingdom of Msiri. Msiri was the most militarily powerful ruler in the area and traded large quantities of copper, ivory and slaves—and rumors of gold reached European ears. The scramble for Katanga was a prime example of the period. Rhodes sent two expeditions to Msiri in 1890 led by Alfred Sharpe, who was rebuffed, and Joseph Thomson, who failed to reach Katanga. Leopold sent four expeditions. First, the Le Marinel expedition could only extract a vaguely worded letter. The Delcommune expedition was rebuffed. The well-armed Stairs expedition was given orders to take Katanga with or without Msiri's consent. Msiri refused, was shot, and his head was cut off and stuck on a pole as a "barbaric lesson" to the people. The Bia River expedition finished the job of establishing an administration of sorts and a "police presence" in Katanga. The Congo Free State imposed such a terror regime on the colonized people, including mass killings and forced labour, that Belgium, under pressure from the Congo Reform Association, ended Leopold II's rule and annexed it on 20 August 1908 as a colony of Belgium, known as the Belgian Congo.

The brutality of King Leopold II in his former colony of the Congo Free State was well documented; up to 8 million of the estimated 16 million native inhabitants died between 1885 and 1908. According to Roger Casement, an Irish diplomat of the time, this depopulation had four main causes: "indiscriminate war", starvation, reduction of births and diseases. Sleeping sickness ravaged the country and must also be taken into account for the dramatic decrease in population; it has been estimated that sleeping sickness and smallpox killed nearly half the population in the areas surrounding the lower Congo River. Estimates of the death toll vary considerably. As the first census did not take place until 1924, it is difficult to quantify the population loss of the period. The Casement Report set it at three million. William Rubinstein writes: "More basically, it appears almost certain that the population figures given by Hochschild are inaccurate. There is, of course, no way of ascertaining the population of the Congo before the twentieth century, and estimates like 20 million are purely guesses. Most of the interior of the Congo was literally unexplored if not inaccessible."

A similar situation occurred in the neighbouring French Congo, where most of the resource extraction was run by concession companies, whose brutal methods, along with the introduction of disease, resulted in the loss of up to 50% of the indigenous population according to Hochschild. The French government appointed a commission headed by de Brazza in 1905 to investigate the rumoured abuses in the colony. However, de Brazza died on the return trip, and his "searingly critical" report was neither acted upon nor released to the public. In the 1920s, about 20,000 forced labourers died building a railroad through the French territory.

Egypt, Sudan, and South Sudan

Suez Canal 

In order to construct the Suez Canal, French diplomat Ferdinand de Lesseps had obtained many concessions from Isma'il Pasha, the Khedive of Egypt and Sudan in 1854–56. Some sources estimate the workforce at 30,000, but others estimate that 120,000 workers died over the ten years of construction from malnutrition, fatigue, and disease, especially cholera. Shortly before its completion in 1869, Khedive Isma'il borrowed enormous sums from British and French bankers at high rates of interest. By 1875, he was facing financial difficulties and was forced to sell his block of shares in the Suez Canal. The shares were snapped up by Britain, under Prime Minister Benjamin Disraeli, who sought to give his country practical control in the management of this strategic waterway. When Isma'il repudiated Egypt's foreign debt in 1879, Britain and France seized joint financial control over the country, forcing the Egyptian ruler to abdicate and installing his eldest son Tewfik Pasha in his place. The Egyptian and Sudanese ruling classes did not relish foreign intervention.

Mahdist War 

During the 1870s, European initiatives against the slave trade caused an economic crisis in northern Sudan, precipitating the rise of Mahdist forces. In 1881, the Mahdist revolt erupted in Sudan under Muhammad Ahmad, severing Tewfik's authority in Sudan. The same year, Tewfik suffered an even more perilous rebellion by his own Egyptian army in the form of the Urabi revolt. In 1882, Tewfik appealed for direct British military assistance, commencing Britain's administration of Egypt. A joint British-Egyptian military force entered in the Mahdist War. Additionally the Egyptian province of Equatoria (located in South Sudan) led by Emin Pasha was also subject to an ostensible relief expedition of Emin Pasha against Mahdist forces. The British-Egyptian force ultimately defeated the Mahdist forces in Sudan in 1898. Thereafter, Britain seized effective control of Sudan, which was nominally called Anglo-Egyptian Sudan.

Berlin Conference (1884–1885) 

The occupation of Egypt and the acquisition of the Congo were the first major moves in what came to be a precipitous scramble for African territory. In 1884, Otto von Bismarck convened the 1884–1885 Berlin Conference to discuss the African problem. While diplomatic discussions were held regarding ending the remaining slave trade as well as the reach of missionary activities, the primary concern of those in attendance was preventing war between the European powers as they divided the continent among themselves. More importantly, the diplomats in Berlin laid down the rules of competition by which the great powers were to be guided in seeking colonies. They also agreed that the area along the Congo River was to be administered by Leopold II as a neutral area in which trade and navigation were to be free. No nation was to stake claims in Africa without notifying other powers of its intentions. No territory could be formally claimed prior to being effectively occupied. However, the competitors ignored the rules when convenient, and on several occasions war was only narrowly avoided (see Fashoda Incident). The Swahili coast territories of the Sultanate of Zanzibar were partitioned between Germany and Britain, initially leaving the archipelago of Zanzibar independent until 1890, when that remnant of the Sultanate was made into a British protectorate with the Heligoland–Zanzibar Treaty.

Britain's administration of Egypt and South Africa 

Britain's administration of Egypt and the Cape Colony contributed to a preoccupation over securing the source of the Nile River. Egypt was taken over by the British in 1882, leaving the Ottoman Empire in a nominal role until 1914, when London made it a protectorate. Egypt was never an actual British colony. Sudan, Nigeria, Kenya, and Uganda were subjugated in the 1890s and early 20th century; and in the south, the Cape Colony (first acquired in 1795) provided a base for the subjugation of neighbouring African states and the Dutch Afrikaner settlers who had left the Cape to avoid the British and then founded their own republics. Theophilus Shepstone annexed the South African Republic in 1877 for the British Empire, after it had been independent for twenty years. In 1879, after the Anglo-Zulu War, Britain consolidated its control of most of the territories of South Africa. The Boers protested, and in December 1880 they revolted, leading to the First Boer War. British Prime Minister William Gladstone signed a peace treaty on 23 March 1881, giving self-government to the Boers in the Transvaal. The Jameson Raid of 1895 was a failed attempt by the British South Africa Company and the Johannesburg Reform Committee to overthrow the Boer government in the Transvaal. The Second Boer War, fought between 1899 and 1902, was about control of the gold and diamond industries; the independent Boer republics of the Orange Free State and the South African Republic were this time defeated and absorbed into the British Empire.

The French thrust into the African interior was mainly from the coasts of West Africa (present-day Senegal) eastward, through the Sahel along the southern border of the Sahara. Their ultimate aim was to have an uninterrupted colonial empire from the Niger River to the Nile, thus controlling all trade to and from the Sahel region by virtue of their existing control over the caravan routes through the Sahara. The British, on the other hand, wanted to link their possessions in Southern Africa with their territories in East Africa and these two areas with the Nile basin.

The Sudan (which included most of present-day Uganda) was the key to the fulfillment of these ambitions, especially since Egypt was already under British control. This "red line" through Africa is made most famous by Cecil Rhodes. Along with Lord Milner, the British colonial minister in South Africa, Rhodes advocated such a "Cape to Cairo" empire, linking the Suez Canal to the mineral-rich South Africa by rail. Though hampered by German occupation of Tanganyika until the end of World War I, Rhodes successfully lobbied on behalf of such a sprawling African empire. 

Britain had sought to extend its East African empire contiguously from Cairo to the Cape of Good Hope, while France had sought to extend its own holdings from Dakar to the Sudan, which would enable its empire to span the entire continent from the Atlantic Ocean to the Red Sea. If one draws a line from Cape Town to Cairo (Rhodes's dream), and one from Dakar to the Horn of Africa (the French ambition), these two lines intersect somewhere in eastern Sudan near Fashoda, explaining its strategic importance. 

A French force under Jean-Baptiste Marchand arrived first at the strategically located fort at Fashoda, soon followed by a British force under Lord Kitchener, commander in chief of the British Army since 1892. The French withdrew after a standoff and continued to press claims to other posts in the region. The Fashoda Incident ultimately led to the signature of the Entente Cordiale of 1904, which guaranteed peace between the two.

Moroccan Crises 

Although the Berlin Conference had set the rules for the Scramble for Africa, it had not weakened the rival imperialists.  As a result of the Entente Cordiale, the German Kaiser decided to test the solidity of such influence, using the contested territory of Morocco as a battlefield. Kaiser Wilhelm II visited Tangier on 31 March 1905 and made a speech in favour of Moroccan independence, challenging French influence in Morocco. France's presence had been reaffirmed by Britain and Spain in 1904. The Kaiser's speech bolstered French nationalism, and with British support the French foreign minister, Théophile Delcassé, took a defiant line. The crisis peaked in mid-June 1905, when Delcassé was forced out of the ministry by the more conciliation-minded premier Maurice Rouvier. But by July 1905 Germany was becoming isolated, and the French agreed to a conference to solve the crisis.

The 1906 Algeciras Conference was called to settle the dispute. Of the thirteen nations present, the German representatives found their only supporter was Austria-Hungary, which had no interest in Africa. France had firm support from Britain, the U.S., Russia, Italy, and Spain. The Germans eventually accepted an agreement, signed on 31 May 1906, whereby France yielded certain domestic changes in Morocco but retained control of key areas.

However, five years later the Second Moroccan Crisis (or Agadir Crisis) was sparked by the deployment of the German gunboat Panther to the port of Agadir in July 1911. Germany had started to attempt to match Britain's naval supremacy—the British navy had a policy of remaining larger than the next two rival fleets in the world combined. When the British heard of the Panthers arrival in Morocco, they wrongly believed that the Germans meant to turn Agadir into a naval base on the Atlantic. The German move was aimed at reinforcing claims for compensation for acceptance of effective French control of the North African kingdom, where France's pre-eminence had been upheld by the 1906 Algeciras Conference. In November 1911, a compromise was reached under which Germany accepted France's position in Morocco in return for a slice of territory in the French Equatorial African colony of Middle Congo.

France and Spain subsequently established a full protectorate over Morocco on 30 March 1912, ending what remained of the country's formal independence. Furthermore, British backing for France during the two Moroccan crises reinforced the Entente between the two countries and added to Anglo-German estrangement, deepening the divisions that would culminate in the First World War.

Dervish resistance 

Following the Berlin Conference, the British, Italians, and Ethiopians sought to claim lands inhabited by the Somalis. The Dervish movement, led by Sayid Muhammed Abdullah Hassan, existed for 21 years, from 1899 until 1920. The Dervish movement successfully repulsed the British Empire four times and forced it to retreat to the coastal region. Because of these successful expeditions, the Dervish movement was recognized as an ally by the Ottoman and German empires. The Turks named Hassan Emir of the Somali nation, and the Germans promised to officially recognise any territories the Dervishes were to acquire. After a quarter of a century of holding the British at bay, the Dervishes were finally defeated in 1920 as a direct consequence of Britain's use of aircraft.

Herero Wars and the Maji Maji Rebellion 

Between 1904 and 1908, Germany's colonies in German South West Africa and German East Africa were rocked by separate, contemporaneous native revolts against their rule. In both territories the threat to German rule was quickly defeated once large-scale reinforcements from Germany arrived, with the Herero rebels in German South West Africa being defeated at the Battle of Waterberg and the Maji-Maji rebels in German East Africa being steadily crushed by German forces slowly advancing through the countryside, with the natives resorting to guerrilla warfare.

German efforts to clear the bush of civilians in German South West Africa resulted in a genocide of the population. In total, as many as 65,000 Herero (80% of the total Herero population), and 10,000 Namaqua (50% of the total Namaqua population) either starved, died of thirst, or were worked to death in camps such as Shark Island concentration camp between 1904 and 1908. Between 24,000 and 100,000 Hereros, 10,000 Nama, and an unknown number of San died in the genocide. Characteristic of this genocide was death from starvation, thirst, and possibly the poisoning of the population's wells, whilst they were trapped in the Namib Desert.

Philosophy

Colonial consciousness and exhibitions

Colonial lobby 

In its earlier stages, imperialism was generally the act of individual explorers as well as some adventurous merchantmen. The colonial powers were a long way from approving without any dissent the expensive adventures carried out abroad. Various important political leaders, such as William Gladstone, opposed colonization in its first years. However, during his second premiership between 1880 and 1885 he could not resist the colonial lobby in his cabinet, and thus did not execute his electoral promise to disengage from Egypt. Although Gladstone was personally opposed to imperialism, the social tensions caused by the Long Depression pushed him to favour jingoism: the imperialists had become the "parasites of patriotism." In France, Radical politician Georges Clemenceau was adamantly opposed to it: he thought colonization was a diversion from the "blue line of the Vosges" mountains, that is revanchism and the patriotic urge to reclaim the Alsace-Lorraine region which had been annexed by the German Empire with the 1871 Treaty of Frankfurt. Clemenceau actually made Jules Ferry's cabinet fall after the 1885 Tonkin disaster. According to Hannah Arendt in The Origins of Totalitarianism (1951), this expansion of national sovereignty on overseas territories contradicted the unity of the nation state which provided citizenship to its population. Thus, a tension between the universalist will to respect human rights of the colonized people, as they may be considered as "citizens" of the nation state, and the imperialist drive to cynically exploit populations deemed inferior began to surface. Some, in colonizing countries, opposed what they saw as unnecessary evils of the colonial administration when left to itself; as described in Joseph Conrad's Heart of Darkness (1899)—published around the same time as Kipling's The White Man's Burden—or in Louis-Ferdinand Céline's Journey to the End of the Night (1932).

Colonial lobbies emerged to legitimise the Scramble for Africa and other expensive overseas adventures. In Germany, France, and Britain, the middle class often sought strong overseas policies to ensure the market's growth. Even in lesser powers, voices like Enrico Corradini claimed a "place in the sun" for so-called "proletarian nations", bolstering nationalism and militarism in an early prototype of fascism.

Colonial propaganda and jingoism 

A plethora of colonialist propaganda pamphlets, ideas, and imagery played on the colonial powers' psychology of popular jingoism and proud nationalism. A hallmark of the French colonial project in the late 19th century and early 20th century was the civilizing mission (mission civilisatrice), the principle that it was Europe's duty to bring civilisation to benighted peoples. As such, colonial officials undertook a policy of Franco-Europeanisation in French colonies, most notably French West Africa and Madagascar. During the 19th century, French citizenship along with the right to elect a deputy to the French Chamber of Deputies was granted to the four old colonies of Guadeloupe, Martinique, Guyanne and Réunion as well as to the residents of the "Four Communes" in Senegal. In most cases, the elected deputies were white Frenchmen, although there were some black deputies, such as the Senegalese Blaise Diagne, who was elected in 1914.

Colonial exhibitions 

By the end of World War I the colonial empires had become very popular almost everywhere in Europe: public opinion had been convinced of the needs of a colonial empire, although most of the metropolitans would never see a piece of it. Colonial exhibitions were instrumental in this change of popular mentalities brought about by the colonial propaganda, supported by the colonial lobby and by various scientists. Thus, conquests of territories were inevitably followed by public displays of the indigenous people for scientific and leisure purposes.

Carl Hagenbeck, a German merchant in wild animals and a future entrepreneur of most Europeans zoos, decided in 1874 to exhibit Samoa and Sami people as "purely natural" populations. In 1876, he sent one of his collaborators to the newly conquered Egyptian Sudan to bring back some wild beasts and Nubians. Presented in Paris, London, and Berlin these Nubians were very successful. Such "human zoos" could be found in Hamburg, Antwerp, Barcelona, London, Milan, New York City, Paris, etc., with 200,000 to 300,000 visitors attending each exhibition. Tuaregs were exhibited after the French conquest of Timbuktu (visited by René Caillié, disguised as a Muslim, in 1828, thereby winning the prize offered by the French Société de Géographie); Malagasy after the occupation of Madagascar; Amazons of Abomey after Behanzin's mediatic defeat against the French in 1894. Not used to the climatic conditions, some of the indigenous died from exposure, such as some Galibis in Paris in 1892.

Geoffroy de Saint-Hilaire, director of the Jardin d'Acclimatation, decided in 1877 to organise two "ethnological spectacles", presenting Nubians and Inuit. Ticket sales at the Jardin d'Acclimatation doubled, with a million paying entrances that year, a huge success for these times. Between 1877 and 1912, approximately thirty "ethnological exhibitions" were presented at the zoo. "Negro villages" were presented in Paris' 1878 World's Fair; the 1900 World's Fair presented the famous diorama "living" in Madagascar, while the Colonial Exhibitions in Marseilles (1906 and 1922) and in Paris (1907 and 1931)displayed human beings in cages, often nudes or quasi-nudes. Nomadic "Senegalese villages" were also created, thus displaying the power of the colonial empire to all the population.

In the U.S., Madison Grant, head of the New York Zoological Society, exposed Pygmy Ota Benga in the Bronx Zoo alongside the apes and others in 1906. At the behest of Grant, a scientific racist and eugenicist, zoo director William Temple Hornaday placed Ota Benga in a cage with an orangutan and labeled him "The Missing Link" in an attempt to illustrate Darwinism, and in particular that Africans like Ota Benga are closer to apes than were Europeans. Other colonial exhibitions included the 1924 British Empire Exhibition and the 1931 Paris "Exposition coloniale".

Countering disease 

From the beginning of the 20th century, the elimination or control of disease in tropical countries became a driving force for all colonial powers. The sleeping sickness epidemic in Africa was arrested through mobile teams systematically screening millions of people at risk. In the 1880s cattle brought from British Asia to feed Italian soldiers invading Eritrea turned out to be infected with a disease called rinderpest. It continues to infect 90% of Africa's cattle. Decimation of native herds severely damaged local livelihoods, forcing people to labor for their colonizers.

In the 20th century, Africa saw the biggest increase in its population because of lessening of the mortality rate in many countries through peace, famine relief, medicine, and above all, the end or decline of the slave trade. Africa's population has grown from 120 million in 1900 to over 1 billion today.

Slavery abolition 

The continuing anti-slavery movement in Western Europe became a reason and an excuse for the conquest and colonization of Africa. It was the central theme of the Brussels Anti-Slavery Conference 1889–90. From start of the Scramble for Africa, virtually all colonial regimes claimed to be motivated by a desire to suppress slavery and the slave trade. In French West Africa, following conquest and abolition by the French, over one million slaves fled from their masters to earlier homes between 1906 and 1911. In Madagascar, the French abolished slavery in 1896, and approximately 500,000 slaves were freed. Slavery was abolished in the French controlled Sahel by 1911. Independent nations attempting to westernize or impress Europe sometimes cultivated an image of slavery suppression. In response to European pressure, the Sokoto Caliphate abolished slavery in 1900, and Ethiopia officially abolished slavery in 1932. Colonial powers were mostly successful in abolishing slavery, though slavery remained active in Africa, even though it has gradually moved to a wage economy. Slavery was never fully eradicated in Africa.

Aftermath 

During the New Imperialism period, by the end of the 19th century, Europe added almost  – one-fifth of the land area of the globe – to its overseas colonial possessions. Europe's formal holdings included the entire African continent except Ethiopia, Liberia, and Saguia el-Hamra, the latter of which was eventually integrated into Spanish Sahara. Between 1885 and 1914, Britain took nearly 30% of Africa's population under its control; 15% for France, 11% for Portugal, 9% for Germany, 7% for Belgium and 1% for Italy. Nigeria alone contributed 15 million subjects, more than in the whole of French West Africa or the entire German colonial empire. In terms of surface area occupied, the French were the marginal leaders, but much of their territory consisted of the sparsely populated Sahara.

Political imperialism followed the economic expansion, with the "colonial lobbies" bolstering chauvinism and jingoism at each crisis in order to legitimise the colonial enterprise. The tensions between the imperial powers led to a succession of crises, which exploded in August 1914, when previous rivalries and alliances created a domino situation that drew the major European nations into World War I.

African colonies listed by colonising power

Belgium 

 Congo Free State and
 Belgian Congo (today's 
 Democratic Republic of the Congo)
 Ruanda-Urundi (comprising modern
 Rwanda and
 Burundi, 1922–62)

France

Germany 

 German Kamerun (now Cameroon and part of Nigeria, 1884–1916)
 German East Africa (now Rwanda, Burundi and most of Tanzania, 1885–1919)
 German South-West Africa (now Namibia, 1884–1915)
 German Togoland (now Togo and eastern part of Ghana, 1884–1914)

After the First World War, Germany's possessions were partitioned among Britain (which took a sliver of western Cameroon, Tanzania, western Togo, and Namibia), France (which took most of Cameroon and eastern Togo) and Belgium (which took Rwanda and Burundi).

Italy 

 Italian Eritrea
 Italian Somalia
 Italian Ethiopia
 Oltre Giuba 
 Libya
 Italian Tripolitania
 Italian Cyrenaica
 Italian Libya 

During the interwar period, Italian Ethiopia formed together with Italian Eritrea and Italian Somaliland the Italian East Africa (A.O.I., "Africa Orientale Italiana", also defined by the fascist government as L'Impero).

Portugal

Spain

United Kingdom 

The British were primarily interested in maintaining secure communication lines to India, which led to initial interest in Egypt and South Africa. Once these two areas were secure, it was the intent of British colonialists such as Cecil Rhodes to establish a Cape-Cairo railway and to exploit mineral and agricultural resources. Control of the Nile was viewed as a strategic and commercial advantage.

Independent states 

Liberia was founded, colonised, established and controlled by the American Colonization Society, a private organisation established in order to relocate freed African American and Caribbean slaves from the United States and the Caribbean islands in 1822. Liberia declared its independence from the American Colonization Society on July 26, 1847. Liberia is Africa's oldest republic and the second-oldest black republic in the world (after Haiti). Liberia maintained its independence during the period as it was viewed by European powers as either a territory, colony or protectorate of the United States.

The same powers assumed Ethiopia to be a protectorate of Italy although the country had never accepted this, and its independence from Italy was recognized after the Battle of Adwa which resulted in the Treaty of Addis Ababa in 1896. With the exception of Italian occupation between 1936 and 1941 by Benito Mussolini's military forces, Ethiopia is Africa's oldest independent nation.

Connections to modern-day events 

Anti-neoliberal scholars connect the old scramble to a new scramble for Africa, coinciding with the emergence of an "Afro-neoliberal" capitalist movement in postcolonial Africa. When African nations began to gain independence after World War II, their postcolonial economic structures remained undiversified and linear. In most cases, the bulk of a nation's economy relied on cash crops or natural resources. These scholars claim that the decolonisation process kept independent African nations at the mercy of colonial powers by structurally dependent economic relations. They also claim that structural adjustment programs led to the privatization and liberalization of many African political and economic systems, forcefully pushing Africa into the global capitalist market, and that these factors led to development under Western ideological systems of economics and politics.

Petrostates 

In the era of globalization, several African countries have emerged as petrostates (for example Angola, Cameroon, Nigeria, and Sudan). These are nations with an economic and political partnership between transnational oil companies and the ruling elite class in oil-rich African nations. Numerous countries have entered into a neo-imperial relationship with Africa during this time period. Mary Gilmartin notes that “material and symbolic appropriation of space [is] central to imperial expansion and control”; nations in the globalization era who invest in controlling land internationally are engaging in neocolonialism. Chinese (and other Asian countries) state oil companies have entered Africa's highly competitive oil sector. China National Petroleum Corporation purchased 40% of Greater Nile Petroleum Operating Company. Furthermore, the Sudan exports 50–60% of its domestically produced oil to China, making up 7% of China's imports. China has also been purchasing equity shares in African oil fields, invested in industry related infrastructure development and acquired continental oil concessions throughout Africa.

See also 

 Analysis of Western European colonialism and colonization
 Chronology of Western colonialism
 Durand Line
 Economic history of Africa
 French colonial empire
 Historiography of the British Empire
 International relations (1814–1919)
 List of former sovereign states
 List of French possessions and colonies
 Sykes–Picot Agreement
 White Africans of European ancestry

Notes

References

Works cited

Further reading 

 Aldrich, Robert. Greater France: A History of French Overseas Expansion (1996)
 Atkinson, David. "Constructing Italian Africa: Geography and Geopolitics". Italian colonialism (2005): 15–26.
 Axelson, Eric. Portugal and the Scramble for Africa: 1875–1891 (Johannesburg, Witwatersrand UP, 1967)
 Betts, Raymond F., ed. The scramble for Africa: causes and dimensions of empire (Heath, 1972), short excerpts from historians. online
 Boddy-Evans, Alistair. "What Caused the Scramble for Africa?" African History (2012). online
 Brantlinger, Patrick. "Victorians and Africans: The genealogy of the myth of the dark continent." Critical Inquiry (1985): 166–203. online
 Chamberlain, Muriel Evelyn. The scramble for Africa (4th ed. Routledge, 2014) excerpt and text search; also complete text of 2nd edition 1999

 Curtin, Philip D. Disease and empire: The health of European Troops in the Conquest of Africa (Cambridge University Press, 1998)
 Darwin, John. "Imperialism and the Victorians: The dynamics of territorial expansion." English Historical Review (1997) 112#447 pp. 614–42.
 Finaldi, Giuseppe. Italian National Identity in the Scramble for Africa: Italy's African Wars in the Era of Nation-building, 1870–1900 (Peter Lang, 2009)
 Förster, Stig, Wolfgang Justin Mommsen, and Ronald Edward Robinson, eds. Bismarck, Europe and Africa: The Berlin Africa conference 1884–1885 and the onset of partition (Oxford University Press, 1988) online
 Gifford, Prosser, and William Roger Louis. France and Britain in Africa: Imperial Rivalry and Colonial Rule (1971)
 Gifford, Prosser, and William Roger Louis. Britain and Germany in Africa: Imperial rivalry and colonial rule (1967) online.
 
 Hammond, Richard James. Portugal and Africa, 1815–1910: a study in uneconomic imperialism (Stanford University Press, 1966) online
 Henderson, W.O. The German Colonial Empire, 1884–1919 (London: Frank Cass, 1993)
 Hinsley, F.H. ed. The New Cambridge Modern History, Vol. 11: Material Progress and World-Wide Problems, 1870–98 (1962) contents pp. 593–40.
 Klein, Martin A. Slavery and colonial rule in French West Africa (Cambridge University Press, 1998)
 Koponen, Juhani, The Partition of Africa: A Scramble for a Mirage? Nordic Journal of African Studies, 2, no. 1 (1993): 134.
 Lewis, David Levering. The race to Fashoda : European colonialism and African resistance in the scramble for Africa (1988) online
 Lovejoy, Paul E. Transformations in slavery: a history of slavery in Africa (Cambridge University Press, 2011)
 Lloyd, Trevor Owen. Empire: the history of the British Empire (2001).
 Mackenzie J.M. The Partition of Africa, 1880–1900, and European Imperialism in the Nineteenth Century (London 1983) online
 Middleton, Lamar. The Rape Of Africa (London, 1936) online
 Minawi, Mustafa. The Ottoman Scramble for Africa Empire and Diplomacy an the Sahara and the Hijaz (2016) online
 Oliver, Roland, Sir Harry Johnston and the Scramble for Africa (1959) online
  online
 Penrose, E.F., ed. European Imperialism and the Partition of Africa (London, 1975).
 Perraudin, Michael, and Jürgen Zimmerer, eds. German colonialism and national identity (London: Taylor & Francis, 2010).
 Porter, Andrew,  ed. The Oxford history of the British Empire: The nineteenth century. Vol. 3 (1999)  online pp 624–650.
 Robinson, Ronald, and John Gallagher. "The partition of Africa", in The New Cambridge Modern History vol XI, pp. 593–640 (Cambridge, 1962).
 Robinson, Ronald, and John Gallagher. Africa and the Victorians: The official mind of imperialism (Macmillan, 1961). online
 Rotberg, Robert I. The Founder: Cecil Rhodes and the Pursuit of Power (1988) excerpt and text search;
 Sarr, Felwine, and Savoy, Bénédicte, The Restitution of African Cultural Heritage, Toward a New Relational Ethics (2018) http://restitutionreport2018.com/sarr_savoy_en.pdf 
 Sanderson, G.N., "The European partition of Africa: Coincidence or conjuncture?" Journal of Imperial and Commonwealth History (1974) 3#1 pp. 1–54.
 Stoecker, Helmut. German imperialism in Africa: From the beginnings until the Second World War (Hurst & Co., 1986.)
 Thomas, Antony. Rhodes: The Race for Africa (1997)  excerpt and text search
 Thompson, Virginia, and Richard Adloff. French West Africa (Stanford University Press, 1958)
 Vandervort, Bruce. Wars of Imperial Conquest in Africa, 1830―1914 (Indiana University Press, 2009).
 Wesseling, H.L. and Arnold J. Pomerans. Divide and rule: The partition of Africa, 1880–1914 (Praeger, 1996.)

Primary sources 

 Brooke-Smith, Robin.  Documents And Debate: The Scramble For Africa (Macmillan Education, 1987) online
 Chamberlain. M.E. The Scramble for Africa (2nd ed. 1999) pp 94-125 online

External links 

 
 
 

19th century in Africa
19th century in international relations
20th century in international relations
European colonisation in Africa
Geopolitical rivalry
Partition (politics)
Political geography
History of Africa
History of international relations
New Imperialism
David Livingstone
20th century in Africa
Western culture